Massachusetts Senate's Middlesex and Suffolk district in the United States is one of 40 legislative districts of the Massachusetts Senate. It covers 6.4% of Middlesex County and 10.4% of Suffolk County population in 2010. Democrat Sal DiDomenico of Everett has represented the district since 2013.

Locales represented
The district includes the following localities:
 most of Allston
 part of Cambridge
 Charlestown
 Chelsea
 Everett
 Boston’s West End

Senators 
 Benjamin J. Bowen, circa 1945 
 Richard Henry Lee, circa 1953
 Donald Linwood Gibbs, circa 1957 
 Francis X. McCann, circa 1979 
 George Bachrach, circa 1985 
 Michael John Barrett, circa 1993 
 Sal N. DiDomenico, 2013-current

Images
Portraits of legislators

See also
 List of Massachusetts Senate elections
 List of Massachusetts General Courts
 List of former districts of the Massachusetts Senate
 Middlesex County districts of the Massachusetts House of Representatives: 1st, 2nd, 3rd, 4th, 5th, 6th, 7th, 8th, 9th, 10th, 11th, 12th, 13th, 14th, 15th, 16th, 17th, 18th, 19th, 20th, 21st, 22nd, 23rd, 24th, 25th, 26th, 27th, 28th, 29th, 30th, 31st, 32nd, 33rd, 34th, 35th, 36th, 37th
 Suffolk County districts of the Massachusetts House of Representatives: 1st, 2nd, 3rd, 4th, 5th, 6th, 7th, 8th, 9th, 10th, 11th, 12th, 13th, 14th, 15th, 16th, 17th, 18th, 19th

References

External links
 Ballotpedia
  (State Senate district information based on U.S. Census Bureau's American Community Survey).
 
 League of Women Voters of Boston

Senate 
Government of Middlesex County, Massachusetts
Government of Suffolk County, Massachusetts
Massachusetts Senate